La Tirimbina Wildlife Refuge, is a protected area in Costa Rica, managed under the Central Conservation Area, it was created in 2001 by decree 29998-MINAE.

References 

Nature reserves in Costa Rica
Protected areas established in 2001